Abasi is a village in Sorab taluk of Shimoga district, Karnataka, India.

Falling under Abasi Panchayath, the small village belongs to the Bangalore Division. Eighty-three kilometres west of district headquarters, Shimoga, Abasi is 365 km from state capital Bangalore.

The nearest railway station to the village, the Sagar Jambagaru Railway Station, is at a distance of 28 km. The road to Abasi traverses across towns like Siralkoppa, Sagar, Shikapur, Hirekerur, Sirsi and Hangal.
 kumuta,ulavi

References

Villages in Shimoga district